The 1893–94 season was the 20th season of competitive football by Rangers.

Overview
Rangers played a total of 23 competitive matches during the 1893–94 season. They finished a lowly fourth in the Scottish League Division One with only 8 wins from 18 matches.

However, the club did win the Scottish Cup after being Celtic in the final by 3–1. Hugh McCreadie opened the scoring in the 55th minute then Barker and John McPherson added to the tally in the following thirteen minutes.

Results
All results are written with Rangers' score first.

Scottish League Division One

Scottish Cup

Appearances

See also
 1893–94 in Scottish football
 1893–94 Scottish Cup

Rangers F.C. seasons
Ran